Polaromonas cryoconiti is a Gram-negative, psychrophilic bacterium from the genus Polaromonas, which was isolated from an alpine glacier.

References

External links
Type strain of Polaromonas cryoconiti at BacDive -  the Bacterial Diversity Metadatabase

Comamonadaceae
Bacteria described in 2012